Centrists for Sicily (CpS) is a regional centrist Italian political party active in Sicily.

The party was formed in November 2016 by Gianpiero D'Alia, national president of the Union of the Centre (UdC) and bigwig of the party in Sicily, who wanted to support the "Yes" camp in the 2016 constitutional referendum, as opposed to the party's pro-"No" line, and to continue the alliance with the Democratic Party (PD). The two regional ministers in the PD-led regional government and eight regional deputies out nine joined the new party.

In December, after the huge defeat of the "Yes" camp in the referendum, the CpS was integrated into Centrists for Italy (CpI), led by Pier Ferdinando Casini, and replaced the UdC within the groups of Popular Area (AP) in the Chamber and the Senate.

References

External links
Official page – Sicilian Regional Assembly

Political parties in Sicily
Political parties established in 2016
2016 establishments in Italy
Centrist parties in Italy